Paval may refer to:
Paval, Iran, a village
Paval Sieviaryniets (born 1976), Belarusian journalist and politician
Paval Zhauryd, (1889–1939), Belarusian military commander

See also
Pavel